João Diogo Pinto, ComIH (born 16 November 1974 in Nampula, Mozambique) is an activist, advocate, and expert in International Relations and Politics of the European Union. Having served two terms as the youngest ever Secretary General of the European Movement International, he served as Director of European Friends of Armenia (EuFoA), an International NGO seeking to build bridges between Armenia and the EU between 2016 and 2018, and as Political Advisor to Maria João Rodrigues, Vice-President of the S&D Group in the European Parliament, from April 2018 to July 2019. Since February 2020, he works as Policy Director of the FIA Region I. Diogo Pinto was awarded the class “Commander” of the Order of Prince Henry for services in the expansion of the Portuguese culture, its history and its values. He lives in Brussels, and he often speaks at public events, gives interviews and publishes opinions.

Education and early career

Diogo Pinto grew up in Guimarães, Portugal, after his family moved to the city in 1980. He initiated his studies at Santa Luzia Primary School, moving directly to second grade, and went on to win an award for academic merit, delivered by Sociedade Martins Sarmento, when he was only 8.

For his secondary studies, Diogo Pinto, attended, first, Escola Secundaria Francisco de Holanda and, later, Escola Secundaria Martins Sarmento; in both schools, he was not only recognised as one of the best students, but also known for his extra-curricular activities: as a volleyball player in the youth teams of the defunct Desportivo Francisco de Holanda, and a youth leader in the local chapter of Movimento Catolico de Estudantes (MCE). In 1992, in his senior year, Diogo Pinto was elected President of the Guimarães’ Municipal Youth Council.   
 
That same year, Diogo Pinto moved to Lisbon to pursue his studies, and joined the national leadership of MCE, first as Deputy National Coordinator and, one year later, as National Coordinator of MCE.
 
In 1995, at 20 years-old, Diogo Pinto was elected President of the Portuguese National Youth Council (CNJ), position in which he served parallel to his studies of Sociology at the Instituto Superior de Ciências do Trabalho e da Empresa (ISCTE-IUL). He was President of CNJ until February 1998; soon after his resignation, Diogo Pinto became one of the coordinators of the World Youth Festival’98, which took place in Portugal later that same year. In 1999, he went back to CNJ, first as Project Officer for the 2000 Portuguese Presidency of the European Union and, later, as Board Advisor.

Diogo Pinto became National Director of Intercultura (AFS) Portugal in 2001.

Career at European Youth Forum

In 2005, Diogo Pinto was elected Secretary General of the European Youth Forum, the platform of youth organisations in Europe, representing more than 100 national youth councils and international non-governmental youth organisations, and bringing together tens of millions of young people from all over Europe. The Youth Forum works to empower young people to participate actively in society and strives for youth rights in international institutions such as the European Union, the Council of Europe and the United Nations.

Nominated as a candidate by both EFIL – European Federation of Intercultural Learning  and CNJ – the Portuguese National Youth Council, Diogo Pinto won a close election and took office on May 11, 2005. As Secretary General of the Youth Forum, Diogo Pinto led a team of more than 20 staff, and worked alongside three different Presidents, for two consecutive terms, until the end of May 2009.

During his tenure, the Youth Forum achieved, among others, the adoption of the European Youth Pact, the emergence and consolidation of the EU Structured Dialogue on Youth, and the recognition, by and in the Lisbon Treaty, of specific youth rights to participation in the EU decision-making processes; at the level of the Council of Europe, the successful implementation of the “All Different, All Equal” Campaign Against racism, anti-Semitism, xenophobia and intolerance, and the adoption of “The Future of the Council of Europe youth policy: Agenda 2020” Declaration are both worth mentioning. Last but not least, in 2007, in Lisbon, the Youth Forum co-organised the 1st Europe-Africa Youth Summit, thus inaugurating a new era of cooperation among youth organisations at the global level.

During his two terms, Diogo Pinto organised big events of the Youth Forum in several cities all over Europe, such as Baku, Brussels, Castelldefels, Prato, Rotterdam and Vilnius, and he attended conferences, meetings and other activities in more than 40 countries in 4 different continents.

Career at European Movement International

In June 2009, in Prague, Diogo Pinto was appointed Secretary General of the European Movement International (EMI), the largest pan-European network of pro-European organisations with more than 70 Member Organisations, bringing together European civil society, business, trade unions, NGOs, political parties, local authorities and academia.

Created in 1948 as a follow-up to the Hague Congress of Europe, which took place in The Hague and was presided by Winston Churchill, the European Movement's first major achievement was the creation of the Council of Europe in 1949. The European Movement was also responsible for the creation of the College of Europe in Bruges and the European Centre for Culture in Geneva. One of its major accomplishments during the 1950s and throughout the 1990s was the setting-up of a network of pro-European organisations and think-tanks in almost every European country.

After more than 60 years of playing an essential role in the process of European integration, and in times of European crisis, the European Movement felt the need to reform itself, and develop and implement new structures and procedures. This task was entrusted to the new secretary general. As a result of this, the organisation grew in Members and expanded to new countries, improved its financial health, and managed to consolidate its reputation among pro-European circles, the European institutions and other civil society organisations.

During his first term, important projects and events took place, such as the 2nd and 3rd Congresses of the North-South Mediterranean Dialogue for a Shared Vision of the Future (Alicante and Tunis, respectively), the EMI Congress on Civil Society in Candidate and Potential Candidate Countries (Istanbul) and the EMI Congress on Eastern Partnership Countries (Yerevan), as well as the first ever statutory meeting held outside the EU (Belgrade). During this time, the voice of the EMI was also heard on diverse topics such as the new institutional architecture created by the Treaty of Lisbon, climate protection, poverty and social exclusion, the establishment of the European Citizens' Initiative, European economic governance and the economic crisis, enlargement of the EU, etc.

Diogo Pinto was appointed for a second three-year term as secretary general, at the EMI Federal Assembly meeting held in Brussels on 26 May 2012. In this term, less focus was given to big events and more efforts were put into growing and consolidating the network, developing policies and campaigns. Building-up on the Nobel Peace Prize awarded to the EU, and the first signs of the end of austerity policies, the EMI started looking beyond the crisis and addressed topics such as the need for democratic reforms in the EU, in connection with the EP 2014 Elections.

Throughout the six years of his two terms, Diogo Pinto served alongside two EMI Presidents: Pat Cox and Jo Leinen. Besides the events already mentioned, he organised EMI meetings in cities such as Athens, Dublin, Nicosia, Riga, Rome, Toledo, The Hague and Warsaw, and further visited and attended events in his capacity as Secretary General of the EMI in more than 30 countries.

Career at European Friends of Armenia

In July 2016, Diogo Pinto joined European Friends of Armenia (EuFoA) as its director. EuFoA is an international non-governmental organisation seeking to support integration and build bridges between Armenian and European decision-makers and the civil society, in the fields of politics, business and culture. EuFoA works towards a better understanding of the challenges facing Europe and Armenia, and the relations between the two.

Under Diogo Pinto's leadership, EuFoA addressed issues related to Armenia-European Union relations (especially regarding the new Armenia-EU Comprehensive and Enhanced Partnership Agreement), promoted Armenia and its realities, and gave visibility to Artsakh and the Nagorno-Karabakh conflict, in Brussels and elsewhere in Europe. This was done through the organisation of events, gathering and spreading of analysis and opinions, and a constant dialogue with EU officials and decision-makers. Personalities such as Armen Ashotyan, Frank Engel, Heidi Hautala, Tatoul Markarian, Masis Mayilyan, Ruben Melikyan, Garegin Melkonyan, Serzh Sargsyan, Hans-Jochen Schmidt, Jaromir Stetina, Piotr Świtalski and Arman Tatoyan, are among those who spoke at EuFoA events.

In his capacity as Director of EuFoA, Diogo Pinto traveled regularly to Armenia and Artsakh, spoke at public events, gave interviews and published opinions on topics related to Armenia and the European Union.

Other affiliations

Diogo Pinto was a Member of the Steering Group of the Spinelli Group, founded by Guy Verhofstadt, Daniel Cohn-Bendit, Sylvie Goulard and Isabelle Durant in September 2010.

Between 2010 and 2017, he was a Board Member of "Fondation EurActiv", and its secretary general between July 2015 and July 2016.

Since 2015, Diogo Pinto is a member of the High Council of the European Movement in Portugal, and of the International Advisory Board of the European Movement in Serbia.

Publications

Diogo Pinto is co-author of two books: “20 Ideias para 2020 – Inovar Portugal” (2005) and “Ideias Perigosas para Portugal” (2010).

Recognition

On 10 June 2015, at the commemorations of Portugal's National Day in the city of Lamego,  Diogo Pinto was awarded the class 'Commander' of the Order of Prince Henry, by Aníbal Cavaco Silva, President of the Portuguese Republic.

Personal life

Diogo Pinto is married and has 3 children. He lives in Brussels.

He is fluent in English, French, Portuguese and Spanish (Castilian).

Diogo Pinto is an avid Benfica fan and a paying member of the club since 1994.

References

External links
 Nagorno-Karabakh: 30 years on, time for the EU to raise its game
 EuFoA's 2018 programs to focus on EU-Armenia agreement's ratification process
 New agreement with EU great success for Armenia's diplomacy - Diogo Pinto
 The agreement must be saved
 People know what the text of the CEPA says; no room left for rumors. Diogo Pinto
 Diogo Pinto: A Europeanist on the Armenian cause
 Armenia ready to open new chapter in EU cooperation
 Nagorno-Karabakh: Ballots, not bullets
 European Movement International
 EuroparlTV Interview, Hands off Schengen
 EESC Interview, Facilitating the active participation of Citizens and Civil Society Organisation
 Anthology: raw materials for a history of the European Youth Forum

Eurofederalism
Mozambican emigrants to Portugal
1974 births
Living people